Hydrellia is a genus of shore flies in the family Ephydridae. There are more than 240 described species in Hydrellia.

See also
 List of Hydrellia species

References

Ephydridae
Brachycera genera
Taxa named by Jean-Baptiste Robineau-Desvoidy
Diptera of North America
Diptera of South America
Diptera of Europe